Coprosma intertexta, is a shrub that is native to New Zealand. It occurs in the eastern South Island usually amongst dry scrub or rocky areas.

References

intertexta
Flora of New Zealand
Divaricating plants